The Niraj is a river in the Gurghiu Mountains, Mureș County, northern Romania. Its name originates from the Hungarian word nyár, meaning "poplar". It is a left tributary of the river Mureș. It starts at the confluence of headwaters Nirajul Mare and Nirajul Mic. It flows through the villages Câmpu Cetății, Eremitu, Mătrici, Călugăreni, Dămieni, Grâușorul, Vărgata, Miercurea Nirajului, Dumitreștii, Gălești, Bolintineni, Păsăreni, Murgești, Acățari, Stejeriș, Crăciunești, Ilieni, Gheorghe Doja, Leordeni and joins the Mureș in Vidrasău, near the town Ungheni.

Tributaries
The following rivers are tributaries to the river Niraj (from source to mouth):

Left: Nirajul Mic, Hosu, Călugăreni, Nirajul Mic, Niaroș, Vaia, Pârâul Mare, Tirimia, Cerghid
Right: Nirajul Mare, Diceal, Ciadou, Hodoșa, Vărgata, Valea spre Șardu, Maiad

References

Rivers of Romania
Rivers of Mureș County